Paulisentis is a genus of worms belonging to the family Neoechinorhynchidae.

The species of this genus are found in Northern America.

Species:

Paulisentis fractus 
Paulisentis missouriensis

References

Neoechinorhynchidae
Acanthocephala genera